The Fall River Subdivision is a freight railroad line in the U.S. state of Massachusetts, owned by the Massachusetts Bay Transportation Authority, with freight operations handled by the Massachusetts Coastal Railroad; it was formerly owned and operated by CSX Transportation. The line runs from the New Bedford Subdivision at Myricks (in Berkley) south to Fall River along a former New York, New Haven and Hartford Railroad line. At its south end, at the Rhode Island state line in Fall River, it becomes a line of the Providence and Worcester Railroad.

History
The Fall River Branch Railroad completed the line from Myricks south to Fall River in 1845. The Old Colony and Newport Railway extended the line to Newport, Rhode Island, in 1864. The line later became part of the  NYNH&H until 1958. Penn Central then took over in 1968, followed by Conrail, who took over in 1976. The Fall River Subdivision was assigned to CSX in 1999 after the breakup of Conrail.

On October 2, 2008, the state government announced an agreement with CSX Transportation for the purchase and upgrade of several of CSX's freight lines in the state. CSX agreed to sell the Fall River Secondary and New Bedford Secondary for use by the South Coast Rail project, as well as the Grand Junction Branch, the Framingham-to-Worcester section of the Worcester Line, and the South Boston Running Track. Other parts of the agreement included plans for double-stack freights west of Worcester and the abandonment of Beacon Park Yard. The agreement was signed on September 23, 2009. On June 11, 2010, the state and CSX completed the first phase of the agreement, including the transfer of the South Coast Rail lines to MassDOT; the Massachusetts Coastal Railroad assumed freight rights on the two lines. The two lines were sold for $21.5 million.

The line is currently used primarily to transport chemicals to Borden & Remington in Fall River.

See also
 List of CSX Transportation lines

References

Fall River, Massachusetts
CSX Transportation lines
Rail infrastructure in Massachusetts
Old Colony Railroad lines